Elmenteita is a settlement in Kenya's Rift Valley Province.

References 

Populated places in Nakuru County